The Rickenbacker 325 is the first of the Capri series of hollow body guitars released in 1958 by Rickenbacker.

Overview
It was designed by Roger Rossmeisl, a guitar craftsman from a family of German instrument makers. Production models were  short scale, dot fretboard inlays, and a small body. The body is unbound, semi-hollow, with 2 o'clock angled sound hole (although re-issues lack a sound hole due to the Lennon connection), and boasts the "crescent moon"-style cutaways. This series is currently available only in "C" reissue form. These instruments gained prominence due to Lennon's use of a 325 during the early years of The Beatles. Lennon's 1958 model was among the first batch made and has the pre-production feature of a solid top with no sound hole. All subsequent production short-scale 300-series Rickenbackers (310, 315, 320, 325) had sound holes until the late 1970s.

Notable players
 John Lennon played 325s and their assorted variants during the 1960s (Including a 12-string made to match his second 325). A replica of Lennon's 325 is available as a guitar controller for The Beatles: Rock Band.
 Susanna Hoffs of The Bangles played the 325 and its full scale variant, the model 350 (Hoffs even received her own signature version of the 350).
 John Fogerty played his modified Fireglo 325 on many Creedence Clearwater Revival songs and live concerts, including their appearance at the 1969 Woodstock festival.  Fogerty modified his model to include a Gibson humbucker pickup.
 Maurice Gibb of Bee Gees used the 325 for all live performances between the late 1980s until 2003.
 Multi-instrumentalist Toots Thielemans regularly played Rickenbacker guitars and his usage of a Combo 400 model inspired John Lennon, a fan of Thielemans, to take up the instrument. Incidentally, a photograph of Thielemans at a 1958 US trade shows a 325 that is likely to have been the very guitar later purchased by Lennon in Hamburg.

Gallery

References

Rickenbacker guitars
Semi-acoustic guitars
The Beatles' musical instruments